Mambazha Salai, meaning Mango Market in Tamil, is a commercial neighbourhood of Tiruchirappalli in Tamil Nadu, India. It houses one of the city's principal mango markets.

Notes 

Neighbourhoods and suburbs of Tiruchirappalli